Peter Thomas Marshall Hill  is a British civil servant and a former political advisor. He was appointed CEO of the 26th United Nations Climate Change Conference of the Parties (COP26) in September 2019, having previously been Principal Private Secretary to the Prime Minister.

Hill worked within Peter Mandelson's and his successor Catherine Ashton's cabinet when they were the European Trade Commissioner between 2006 and 2009.

Following the Conservative Party's return to government in 2010, Hill worked in the office for security and counter-terrorism when Theresa May was Home Secretary. In 2013, Hill moved from the Home Office to work in the Foreign Office as the Director of Strategy to three former Foreign Secretaries: William Hague, Philip Hammond and Boris Johnson.

The Prime Minister, Theresa May, appointed Peter Hill as her Principal Private Secretary in May 2017 following his predecessor Simon Case's appointment as the Director General for the UK-EU Partnership, to coordinate the process of the consequences of invoking Article 50 of the Treaty on European Union. Hill resigned after Boris Johnson's election as May's successor on 24 July 2019, but remained in the post until his successor was announced.

Hill was appointed Commander of the Royal Victorian Order (CVO) in the 2020 Birthday Honours for services to the Royal Household.

See also
 Principal Private Secretary to the Prime Minister
 Prime Minister's Office

References

Living people
Year of birth missing (living people)
Companions of the Order of the Bath
Commanders of the Royal Victorian Order
Principal Private Secretaries to the Prime Minister